The 98th "HaEsh" Paratroopers Division, also known as the Fire Formation (Utzbat HaEsh), is a reserve-service infantry division in the Israel Defense Forces.  It is subordinate to the Central Regional Command.

Units 

35th Paratroopers Brigade (Regular) "Flying Serpent"
89th Commando Brigade (Regular) "Oz"/"Courage"
214th Artillery Regiment (Regular) "David's Sling" (In Hebrew) 
55th Paratroopers Brigade (Reserve) "Hod Ha-Hanit"/"Tip of The Spear"
551st Paratroopers Brigade (Reserve) "Hetzei Ha-Esh"/"Arrows of Fire"
Unit 8219
492nd Division Signal Battalion "Lapid"
Saknay (Pelican) Unit
Mobility Unit 5515 "Niyud" (In Hebrew) 
Airborne Anti-Aircraft Unit 7298 "YANMAM"
 

Divisions of Israel
Central Command (Israel)
Airborne divisions